Quantum counting algorithm is a quantum algorithm for efficiently counting the number of solutions for a given search problem.
The algorithm is based on the quantum phase estimation algorithm and on Grover's search algorithm.

Counting problems are common in diverse fields such as statistical estimation, statistical physics, networking, etc.
As for quantum computing, the ability to perform quantum counting efficiently is needed in order to use Grover's search algorithm (because running Grover's search algorithm requires knowing how many solutions exist). Moreover, this algorithm solves the quantum existence problem (namely, deciding whether any solution exists) as a special case.

The algorithm was devised by Gilles Brassard, Peter Høyer and Alain Tapp in 1998.

The problem 
Consider a finite set  of size  and a set  of "solutions" (that is a subset of ). Define:

Calculate the number of solutions .

Classical solution 

The algorithm

Setup
The input consists of two registers (namely, two parts): the upper  qubits comprise the first register, and the lower  qubits are the second register.

Create superposition
After applying multiple bit Hadamard gate operation on each of the registers separately, the state of the first register is

and the state of the second register is

an equal superposition state in the computational basis.

Grover operator

Note that

which is the state of the second register after the Hadamard transform.

in the orthonormal basis .

From the properties of rotation matrices we know that  is a unitary matrix with the two eigenvalues .

Estimating the value of 

Note that the second register is actually in a superposition of the eigenvectors of the Grover operator (while in the original quantum phase estimation algorithm, the second register is the required eigenvector). This means that with some probability, we approximate , and with some probability, we approximate ; those two approximations are equivalent.

Analysis 
Assuming that the size  of the space is at least twice the number of solutions (namely, assuming that ), a result of the analysis of Grover's algorithm is:

The error

Uses

Grover's search algorithm for an initially-unknown number of solutions

Speeding up NP-complete problems
The quantum counting algorithm can be used to speed up solution to problems which are NP-complete.

An example of an NP-complete problem is the Hamiltonian cycle problem, which is the problem of determining whether a graph  has a Hamiltonian cycle.

Searching through all the possible orderings of the graph's vertices can be done with quantum counting followed by Grover's algorithm, achieving a speedup of the square root, similar to Grover's algorithm. This approach finds a Hamiltonian cycle (if exists); for determining whether a Hamiltonian cycle exists, the quantum counting algorithm itself is sufficient (and even the quantum existence algorithm, described below, is sufficient).

Quantum existence problem

A trivial solution to this problem is directly using the quantum counting algorithm: the algorithm yields , so by checking whether  we get the answer to the existence problem. Quantum phase estimation can be optimized to eliminate this overhead. 

Quantum relation testing problem
Quantum relation testing . is an extension of quantum existence testing, it decides whether at least one entry can be found in the data base which fulfils the relation to a certain reference value.  E.g.  gives back YES if the data base contains any value larger than 5 else it returns NO. Quantum relation testing combined with classical logarithmic search forms an efficient quantum min/max searching algorithm.

See also 
 Quantum phase estimation algorithm
 Grover's algorithm
 Counting problem (complexity)

References 

Quantum algorithms